Shivers was a UK-based magazine that began publication in 1992. It was dedicated to horror movies, television shows and literature. It ceased publication in May 2008.

History
The first 12 issues were edited by Alan Jones and the next 120 by David Miller. Issue #1 appeared in June 1992. After David Miller left the company, the final half-dozen contained no editor credit. The last issue (number 138) appeared in mid-2008. The magazine was produced by Visual Imagination and regular contributors included David J. Howe, Alan Jones, Ingrid Pitt, Jonathan Rigby, Kim Newman, Cleaver Patterson and Alex Wylie.

The magazine's regular features for much of its run included a News section written by Jones, an item called The Pitt of Horror by Pitt, a book review section by Howe, an Opinion column by Newman and an end-of-magazine film analysis called The Fright of Your Life originated by Patterson and continued by Rigby.

External links
 Official Shivers Website

Film magazines published in the United Kingdom
Defunct magazines published in the United Kingdom
Fanzines
Horror fiction magazines
Magazines established in 1992
Magazines disestablished in 2008
Speculative fiction magazines published in the United Kingdom
Eight times annually magazines published in the United Kingdom